Lowell Music Magnet School, also known as Lowell Elementary School is an elementary school in Duluth, Minnesota, United States. It serves students in grades K-5. It is a magnet school that provides musical education in orchestra, band, choir, and piano. Lowell Music Magnet Elementary School serves 494 students in grades KG-5. The school's student:teacher ratio of 17:1 is higher than the MN state average of 15:1.

References

External links
 Lowell Elementary School

Education in Duluth, Minnesota
Public elementary schools in Minnesota
Magnet schools in Minnesota
Schools in St. Louis County, Minnesota